Eva Poor is a female Hungarian former international table tennis player.

Table tennis career
She won a bronze medal at the 1963 World Table Tennis Championships, in the Corbillon Cup (women's team event) for Hungary with Éva Kóczián, Erzsebet Heirits and Sarolta Lukacs.

See also
 List of World Table Tennis Championships medalists

References

Hungarian female table tennis players
World Table Tennis Championships medalists